Abraham Katzir (born 1941 in Jerusalem, Israel) is a Professor of Physics at Tel Aviv University, holding the Carol and Mel Taub Chair in Applied Medical Physics.  He is the son of Professor Aharon Katzir, also a scientist, who was killed in 1972 in Ben-Gurion Airport by Japanese terrorists. His uncle, Professor Ephraim Katzir, was the President of Israel.

Abraham Katzir got his PhD from the Hebrew University in Jerusalem in 1974, and joined Caltech in Pasadena, California, as a Senior Research Fellow.  In 1977 he established the Applied Physics Group at Tel Aviv University, which he heads.  In the past, Prof. Katzir worked in some of the top research laboratories in the US.  He was a Visiting Member of Staff  at ATT Bell Laboratories in Summit, New Jersey, and he was a Visiting Professor at the Massachusetts Institute of Technology (MIT) in Cambridge, Massachusetts, and in Boston University, Boston, Massachusetts.

Katzir is an expert in the fields of biomedical optics and fiber optics.  His group at Tel Aviv University developed special fibers made of crystalline silver halides, which are among the few that are highly transparent in the middle-infrared (mid-IR).  He and members of the group have been involved with research and development of new methods and new systems, based on these fibers. They made significant contributions to the use of mid-IR fibers for scientific, medical, industrial and environmental protection applications. In the course of this work, Katzir collaborated with leading scientists in major national laboratories, universities, research institutions and industrial companies, all over the world.

Katzir supervised the research work of tens of students in MSc and PhD dissertations. He also published the book "Lasers and Optical Fibers in Medicine".

Katzir is the Chair of ILEOS, the Israel Lasers and Electro Optics Society,  and the Chair of the bi-annual OASIS (Optical Applied Science in Israel)  international conferences that this society organizes in Israel. He has been a member of the board of governors of SPIE,  the International Society for Optics and Photonics, a member of the board of IUPAP,  the International Union of Pure and Applied Physics,  and of other international bodies.  He has organized and chaired tens of international symposia and conferences in the fields of biomedical optics, optical fibers, and electro-optics.

Each year, Katzir organizes a series of popular lectures, called "In the Crucible of Revolution", in memory of his late father. Tens of thousands of people have attended these lectures.

References

Academic staff of Tel Aviv University
1941 births
Israeli physicists
Hebrew University of Jerusalem alumni
Living people
Jewish physicists